Gallieni-Cancéropôle is a railway station in Toulouse, Occitanie, France. The station opened on 13 December 2009 and is on the Toulouse-Saint-Agne–Auch railway. The train services are operated by SNCF.

Location 
The station is located on the Toulouse-Auch railway, in the Croix de Pierre district of Toulouse. It serves the Gallieni High School and the Toulouse Cancer Institute.

The station has two platforms, one either side of a level crossing.

Train services
The station is served by the following services:
Regional services (TER Occitanie) Toulouse – Colomiers – L'Isle-Jourdain – Auch

References 

Railway stations in Haute-Garonne
Railway stations in France opened in 2009